Institute for Manufacturing (IfM) is part of the Department of Engineering of the University of Cambridge. The IfM integrates research and education with practical application in industry. It disseminates its research findings via a university-owned knowledge transfer company, IfM Engage.
 
Research undertaken at the IFM is done in collaboration with companies, ensuring its relevance to industrial needs and the rapid dissemination of new ideas and approaches. The IfM's education programs combine a thorough grounding in management and manufacturing technology with the chance to put theory into practice via industry-based projects.

Its interest encompasses a broad range of manufacturing activities, from understanding markets and technologies, through the process and product design to production and supply chain operations and through-life services; all within an economics and policy context.

Location 
The IfM is located at the Alan Reece building on the university's West Cambridge Site. Previously, the institute occupied the former Cambridge University Press building in Mill Lane before moving to the large, custom building in West Cambridge, in June 2009.

IfM Engage 
IfM Engage Ltd is a university-owned company, embedded within the IfM and responsible for the IfM's knowledge transfer and dissemination activities. IfM Engage involves a team of experienced industry professionals. They work closely with IfM research centers to ensure a seamless exchange of ideas between the industry and the university. They engage with companies via a program of education and consultancy services, short courses, and events. Projects range from small-scale operational improvements for local companies 
to a major business realignment of multi-national corporations, and the public sector

References

External links
 Institute for Manufacturing website

Manufacturing, Institute for
Cambridge, Manufacturing
Manufacturing in the United Kingdom
Research institutes in Cambridge